Wijayaratnam Hindu National College is a government school in Negombo, Western Province, Sri Lanka. The school was found in 1932 by S.K. Wijayaratnam for the Negombo Tamil people. Wijayaratnam Hindu Central College is the only Hindu Tamil school in the Gampaha District, Sri Lanka.

Principals 
 (1954-10-10–1962-12-30) K. Mayilvaganam
 (1962-12-31–1964-03-15) Mr. Kanthasami
 (1964-03-16–1974-01-31) E.S. Sothinathan
 (1974-01031–19798-02-15) Mr. V. Sanmugarajah
 (1979-02-16–1980-05-05) Mr.V. Nadarajah
 (1980-05-06–1980-11-29) Mr.E. Pathmanathan
 (1980-11-30–1981-01-16) Mr.N Balasubramaniyam
 (1981-01-16–1981-02-20) Mr.E.S.V. Perera
 (1981-02-20–1994-12-31) Mrs. A. Kalyanasundaram
 (1995-01-01–1996-06-30) Mr.A.Sanmugarajah
 (1996-07-01–2014-09-10) Mr.N.Ganesalingam 
 (2014-09-10–2022-10-08) Mr.N.Puwaneshwara Raja
 (2022-10-09-present) Mrs.UmaSrikumar (Principal)

Official Facebook Page

https://www.facebook.com/Wijayaratnamhcc/

Official YouTube Page

https://www.youtube.com/channel/UCIJLIagot_afpm3uBGLGWXA

References 

Schools in Gampaha District